Stacey Fox (born June 21, 1965 in Ithaca, New York) is an American transdisciplinary artist, animator, master percussionist, composer and filmmaker.

Education
Fox graduated in 1983 from Saratoga Springs High School, Saratoga Springs, NY. She went on to study percussion with James Peterscak and conducting with Timothy Topolevski at the Crane School of Music, State University of New York at Potsdam. There she received her Bachelor of Music in music education and Master of Music in solo performance - percussion. She later went on for post graduate studies in solo performance at Arizona State University.

Career
Her sound and visual works are kinetic based with a heavy emphasis on indigenous and Taoist themes. She has received grants and awards for her work in arts education and with indigenous peoples using technology to preserve cultural traditions. Currently, she is at the cutting edge of creativity, performance and education in the use of cyber performance and motion capture technologies production in virtual worlds, augmented and mixed realities in telematic and transmedia performances. Her creative and educational works have been supported through funding from American Composers Forum, National Aeronautics and Space Administration NASA, National Endowment for the Arts, Kennedy Center Partners in Education, Arts International, Rockefeller Foundation, Fulbright-Hays, Doris Duke Foundation, NYSCA, NYFA, Target Foundation, The Walt Disney Company, and the Kauffman Foundation.  Her works have been experienced in numerous venues including Tang Museum, National Museum of Dance, National Museum of the American Indian, American Dance Festival, Second Life, Smithsonian Institution, Université de Paris, Skopje Summer Festival Macedonia, Belarus Philharmonic, Olympolis Art Project Greece, Gifu Arts Center - Japan and Judson Church - NYC.  She is currently Wizard-in-Residence in the School of Journalism at Michigan State University where she is affiliated with the Knight Center for Environmental Journalism. She has collaborated as Senior Educational Design Technology Adviser and Lead Artist on projects for the Smithsonian Institution and represented the United States as an Artist Ambassador performing and teaching in various countries through the invitation of the U.S Department of States' Performing Arts Initiative Program.

Discography
Songs of Mars - Songs about the Planet Mars and Rovers
Maria's Pond — solo chanting and hand drumming CD
Echoes of Flight  — solo piano CD
Unmetered  — solo piano CD
Chuang Tzu’s Pow wow Drum  — soundtrack
Drumming — percussion CD
Alternative Scores  — electronic and voices CD
Drums  — percussion CD

Filmography
This list is incomplete
Chuang Tzu’s Pow wow Drum — film
Children of the Wakarusa — film
Balls — film component
New Dawn Native Dancers — film
Hidden Pools — multimedia work
Cultivating Stillness — film

References

1965 births
Living people
American percussionists
Musicians from New York (state)
American women composers
21st-century American composers
Mixed-media artists
American filmmakers
American animators
21st-century American women musicians
21st-century women composers